Phra Phutthabat is a district (amphoe) in Saraburi province, Thailand.

The district is named after the Phra Phutthabat Temple. Another well-known temple in the district is Wat Tham Krabok, both as a Hmong refugee camp and for its drug rehabilitation program.

Geography
Neighboring districts are (clockwise from the north): Mueang Lopburi and Phatthana Nikhom of Lopburi province; and Chaloem Phra Kiat, Sao Hai, Ban Mo, Nong Don.

Administration
Phra Phuttabat is divided into nine sub-districts (tambons), which are further divided into 67 villages (mubans).

External links
amphoe.com (Thai)

Phra Phutthabat